Lampius (died 400 AD) was bishop of Barcelona from 393 to 400 AD.  He is best remembered for being responsible for the ordination of Saint Paulinus of Nola on Christmas, 393 AD, in the cathedral of Barcelona.  He also attended the First Council of Toledo.

Notes

External links
Episcopologi (In Catalan)

Bishops of Barcelona
4th-century bishops in Hispania
400 deaths
Year of birth unknown